Glitter is the debut album of ex-Schwarz Stein vocalist Kaya, released on December 27, 2006.

Glitter contains remixes Kaya's first two singles "Kaleidoscope" and "Masquerade", as well as "Psycho Butterfly", the B-side of "Masquerade". All background music is composed by Hora (ex Schwarz Stein).

Track listing
"Kaleidoscope -Glitter mix" - 4:23
"Walküre" - 4:38 (Valkyrie)
"Paradise lost" - 4:45
"Psycho Butterfly -Nightmare mix-" - 5:57
"Masquerade -Fabulous Night mix-" - 5:22
"Rose Jail" - 3:30
"Silvery Dark" - 6:37
"Glitter Arch"- 4:43
"Hydrangea" - 5:50

References

Kaya (Japanese musician) albums
2006 debut albums